Fung may refer to:

Feng (surname), a Chinese surname that is Fung in Cantonese
Funj people, also spelled Fung

See also
Phung (disambiguation)